Ajith Rupasinghe Surendra (14 February 1943 – 3 April 2017) was a Sri Lankan political activist.

While he was living and studying in the United States, he was introduced to communism by his older brother Kumar Rupesinghe. He studied for a PhD in sociology at the University of California. Surendra supported the Nepal revolution initiated by Communist Party of Nepal (Maoist Centre) through Nepalese Civil War and condemned when they abandoned the war to sign the  Comprehensive Peace Accord in 2006 

Ajith Rupesinghe returned to Sri Lanka and joined the Ceylon Communist Party (Maoist). He assumed the leadership of the party as the General Secretary after the death of N. Sanmugathasan in 1993, and remained leader until his death in 2017. He took the initiative to distinguish the party name with Ceylon Communist Party and changed from 'Ceylon Communist Party (Peking Wing)' to  Ceylon Communist Party (Maoist).

Under the leadership of Surendra the Ceylon Communist Party (Maoist) openly supported Vikramabahu Karunaratne for the 2010 Sri Lankan presidential election. This stand was welcomed by most of the leftist parties because from 1965 the Ceylon Communist Party (Maoist) was boycotting all the elections held in Sri Lanka after N. Sanmugathasan contested in Colombo Central.

References

20th-century Sri Lankan politicians
Sri Lankan communists
1943 births
2017 deaths
University of California alumni
People from British Ceylon
Maoists
Anti-revisionists
Communism in Sri Lanka
People of the Nepalese Civil War